Ambulyx amboynensis is a species of moth in the family Sphingidae. It was described by Ulf Eitschberger, Andreas Bergmann and Armin Hauenstein in 2006 and is known from Ambon in Indonesia.

References

Ambulyx
Moths described in 2006
Moths of Indonesia